Gobron also known as Mikel-Gobron or Michael-Gobron (died November 17, 914) was a Christian Georgian military commander who led the defense of the fortress of Q'ueli against the Sajid emir of Azerbaijan. When the fortress fell after a 28-day-long siege, Gobron was captured and beheaded, having rejected inducements to convert to Islam. Shortly after his death Gobron became the subject of the hagiography authored by Bishop Stephen of T'beti and a saint of the Georgian Orthodox Church, which commemorates him on November 17 (O.S., which equates to November 30 on the Gregorian calendar). His martyrdom is also mentioned by the medieval Georgian and Armenian chronicles.

Biography
Gobron is a subject of The Passion of the Holy Martyr Gobron, who was Abducted from the Castle of Q'ueli (წამებაჲ წმიდისა მოწამისა გობრონისი, რომელი განიყვანეს ყუელის ციხით), composed by Bishop Stephen of T'beti (Stepane Mtbevari) at the behest of the Georgian Bagratid prince Ashot I of Tao between 914 and 918. The narrative of Gobron's martyrdom unfolds against the background of the military expedition by Yusuf Ibn Abi'l-Saj, the Sajid emir of Azerbaijan, in Georgia in 914. This campaign was one of the last major attempts on the part of the Abbasid Caliphate to retain its crumbling hold of the Georgian lands, which, at that time, were a patchwork of rival, native states and Muslim holdings.

Yusuf Ibn Abi'l-Saj, the Abul-Kasim of the medieval Georgian sources, invaded Georgia from Armenia. He advanced, through the Muslim emirate of Tiflis, into Kakheti, whence he moved into Kartli and invaded Samtskhe and Javakheti. Unable to seize hold of the fortress of Tmogvi, the emir laid siege to Q'ueli, which was then in possession of the Georgian Bagratid prince Gurgen of Tao. Q'ueli held out for 28 days: the young commander Gobron, whose original name—we are told by his biography—was Mikel (Michael), mounted a fierce resistance and made a series of sorties, but he finally felt obliged to surrender to the emir. The Georgian king Adarnase succeeded in ransoming certain nobles who had been seized by the Muslims in Q'ueli, but Gobron was kept by the emir in captivity. Neither the promise of honors, nor tortures and witnessing the massacre of 133 of his comrades-in-arms could inveigle Gobron into renouncing Christianity as demanded by Yusuf. According to the Passion, Gobron, grateful to Christ for being chosen as a martyr, met his death through decapitation.

Gobron's defense of Q'ueli, his capture and execution are briefly described by the 11th-century anonymous Chronicle of Kartli, part of the Georgian Chronicles, which makes reference to the more detailed account by Stephen of T'beti. The execution of Mik'ayel, of Gogarene, is also mentioned by the 10th-century Armenian historian John of Draskhanakert and later by his compatriot Stephen of Taron.

References

External links
 Martyrium Gobronis TITUS Old Georgian hagiographical and homiletic texts: Part No. 22. Accessed November 26, 2011.

Saints of Georgia (country)
10th-century Christian saints
Eastern Orthodox martyrs
914 deaths
Deaths by decapitation
10th-century people from Georgia (country)
Year of birth unknown